Oru Pazhaya Bomb Kadha (English: An Old Bomb Story) is a 2018 Indian comedy film originally released in Malayalam. It was directed by Shafi and written by Binju Joseph, Shafi, and Sunil Karma. The film stars Bibin George and Prayaga Martin. It was produced by Allwyn Antony, Gijo Kavanal, Sreejith Ramachandran and Zachariah Thomas under United Global United Media.

Plot 
The film begins in Bombay with police officers chasing Rudra Nayak, a dangerous terrorist who has been branded as a Maoist. However, his group escapes and secretly arrives in Kerala. The film then introduces Sreekuttan who is a handicapped mechanic, whose best friend, Bhavyan, is also a mechanic. 

Sreekuttan falls for Shruti and attempts to woo her with his charm. Unfortunately, Shruti doesn’t reciprocate, which leaves him devastated. One day Sreekuttan and Bhavyan receive a call to fix a car. The duo tricks the car owner because of his behaviour towards them and makes him push the car. They then leave him there after seeing Shruti and her friend in the distance. Little did they know that the car owner is the new police inspector in town, Rajendran. When Rajendran realizes that he has been tricked, he gets back at Sreekuttan and Bhavyan. Due to this incident, Sreekuttan is unable to pay medical bills for his father, who later passes away. This incident infuriates Sreekuttan. 

He sets out to confront the policeman, which leads to a fist fight that Sreekutan loses. This series of events makes Sreekutan so angry that he vows vengeance on the cop. In a disturbed frame of mind, he decides to plant a bomb in the cop’s car with the help of his old friend Unni who is serving jail time for a bombing incident.

Though initially reluctant, Unni later agrees to help him make the bomb. He refuses to make it by himself as he promised his mother that he would not make any more bombs. Sreekuttan’s intention was to hurt the policeman so that he could bear the same pain as him, but Bhavyan’s intentions were different and he secretly asks Unni to create a deadly  omb that would kill the Inspector instead of only hurting him. Amidst all this Rudra Nayak seeks refuge in the village.

One night, while the duo enter Rajendran's house and plant the time bomb in his jeep, Rajendran enters the jeep. Sreekuttan sets the time to 45 minutes. They briefly follow the jeep, but then lose it. Rajendran goes to Rudra Nayak's hideout from where he escaped and seizes their weapons. On his way back, he sees Bhavyan standing near his bike with a bottle of alcohol while Sreekuttan is urinating in the bushes. Rajendran dislikes those who drink, as a result, he arrests Bhavyan and takes him to the police station in his jeep. All this time the timer is ticking away. With just a few minutes before the bomb is set to explode, Bhavyan tries to escape using a number of excuses, but fails to do so. The bomb is deactivated when the jeep gets jammed in a gutter allowing Bhavyan to get away. When Sreekuttan realizes that the bomb, didn’t explode he comes up with another plan. He decides to thrash the policeman.

One night, while Rajendran is driving back home, he receives a warning from his superior that Rudra Nayak has threatened to kill him. Amidst all this, Sreekutan sets his plan in motion. He placed a sack on Rajendrans' route. Spotting the suspicious sack, Rajendra investigates, which is when he hears some noises coming from the jungle nearby. He decides to follow the noise and goes deeper into the jungle, where Sreekutan and Bhavyan await. As soon as Rajendra is in range, Sreekutan throws chilli powder at him, blinding him. Sreekutan and Bhavyan then tie him up, beat him brutally and throw him in the well. Immediately after the incident, they both feel guilty and take Rajendran to the hospital. When Rajendran regains consciousness, he thinks that he was beaten up by Rudra Nayak and was saved by Sreekutan and Bhavyan. Rajendran thanks them and apologizes for beating Sreekuttan. Thus, Sreekuttan accomplishes his mission. 

Shruti then meets him and apologizes for behaving rudely. She thanks him for saving her father Rajendran. She walks away indicating her feelings for him. Meanwhile, Rudra Nayak attacks the police station with his gang and takes back their weapons. He accidentally chooses the jeep with the bomb while trying to escape. On their way, the bomb explodes, killing Rudra Nayak and his group.

Cast

 Bibin George as Sreekuttan 
 Prayaga Martin as Shruti
 Vishnu Unnikrishnan as Unnikrishnan.P  (Cameo)
 Hareesh Kanaran as Onara Bhavyan
 Indrans as Mohan (Sreekuttan's father)
 Kalabhavan Shajohn as S.I Rajendran
 Vijayaraghavan as Palathara Joseph
 Harisree Asokan as Kumaran Asan
 Sreevidya Mullachery as Sreekuttan's sister
 Binu Adimali as villager
 Balachandran Chullikadu as Rohith Shetty
 Sunil Sukhada as Chacko
 Baiju Ezhupunna as Faizal
 Bijukuttan as Shasi
 Kulappulli Leela
 Ponnamma Babu as Mollykutty Joseph
 Narayanankutty
 Sohan Seenulal
 Dinesh Prabhakar 
 Kalabhavan Haneef
 Manju Sunil
 Sajan Palluruthy
 Babu Annur
 Santhosh Keezhattoor
 Annie as Ganga
 Salim Kumar as Manavalan, Okhi Brother-in-law (Photo Credit)
 Ameya Mathew as Ancy

Release
Oru Pazhaya Bomb Kadha was released in India on 20 July 2018.

References

External links
 

2010s Malayalam-language films
Indian comedy films
Films shot in Kochi